Miss India International or Miss International India is a title given to the Indian woman who represents India in the Miss International Pageant, an annual, international beauty pageant held in Japan.Glamanand Supermodel India chooses the Indian representative for Miss International.

History

Iona Pinto was crowned the first Miss India International was crowned in the year 1960. She represented India at Miss International pageant held on 12 August 1960 at the Long Beach Municipal Auditorium in Long Beach, California, United States.

Titleholders
Color key

References

Beauty pageants in India
Indian awards
Miss International